Microcetus is a genus of extinct odontocete from the late Oligocene (Chattian) of Nordrhein-Westfalen, Germany.

Taxonomy
The type species of Microcetus, M. ambiguus, was originally described as a new species of Phoca on the basis of teeth from late Oligocene deposits in northwestern Germany. The odontocete nature of the teeth was eventually recognized, and it was eventually assigned to Squalodon, before being made the type species of a new genus, Microcetus.

Misassigned species
 Microcetus hectori Benham, 1935 = Waipatia hectori
 Microcetus sharkovi Dubrovo and Sharkov, 1971 = likely a distinct genus, but affinities uncertain

References

Fossil taxa described in 1923
Oligocene cetaceans
Cenozoic mammals of Europe